The Diocese of Minori was a Roman Catholic diocese in Italy, located in Minori, province of Salerno, region of Campania in the ecclesiastical province of Amalfi. In 1815, it was suppressed, and its territory and Catholic population assigned to the Archdiocese of Amalfi.

History

1968: Restored as Titular Episcopal See of Minori

Bishops

Diocese of Minori
Erected: 987 (Dioecesis Minorensis)
Metropolitan: Archdiocese of Amalfi

Paulus de Surrento (26 March 1390 – 1393)
Ambrosius Romano (attested 1411)
Cristoforo Oliva (attested 1418)
Nicola Moccia (Macza) (7 Jan 1426 – 1474 Died)
...
Andrea de Conto (Cuncto) (6 Jun 1483 – 4 Feb 1484 Appointed, Archbishop of Amalfi)
...
Alessandro Salati (30 Apr 1498 – 1509 Died)
Tommaso di Sicilia, O.P. (30 Sep 1510 – 1 Jan 1526 Died)
Giovanni Pietro de Bono, O.P.  (28 Feb 1526 – 6 Jun 1546 Died)
Ambrogio Catarino Politi, O.P.  (27 Aug 1546 – 3 Jun 1552 Appointed, Archbishop of Conza)
Antonio Simeoni,  O.S.B. (3 Jun 1552 – 3 Jul 1553 Appointed, Bishop of Nepi e Sutri)
Pierre de Affatatis (3 Jul 1553 – 1557 Died)
Donato Laurenti (21 Jun 1557 – 29 Jan 1563 Appointed, Bishop of Ariano)
Alessandro Mollo (Moro) (15 Feb 1563 – 1565 Died)
Giovanni D'Amato (12 Oct 1565 – 1567 Resigned)
Giovanni Agostino Campanile (8 Aug 1567 – 4 Jul 1594 Died)
Orazio Basilisco (29 May 1596 – 29 Jul 1596 Died)
Tommaso Zerula (8 Jan 1597 – 6 Dec 1603 Died)
Giorgio Lazzari, O.P.  (19 Jul 1604 – 1615 Died)
Tommaso Brandolini, O.P.  (2 Dec 1615 – 1636 Died)
Loreto Di Franco (De Franchis) (1 Dec 1636 – 1638 Died)
Patrizio Donati (28 Feb 1639 – Aug 1648 Resigned)
Leonardo Leria, O. Carm. (22 Mar 1649 – 1670 Resigned)
Antonio Bottis, C.R.S. (17 Nov 1670 – 1679 Died)
Domenico Menna (20 Dec 1683 – Aug 1691 Died)
Gennaro Crespino (10 Mar 1692 – 19 Jul 1694 Appointed, Bishop of Squillace)
Carlo Cutillo, O.S.B. (13 Sep 1694 Appointed – Dec 1704 Died)
Francesco Morgioni (18 May 1705 – 18 Nov 1712 Died)
Raffaele Tosti (8 Feb 1719 – Mar 1722 Died)
Silvestro Stanà (Staria) (1 Jun 1722 – 26 Nov 1761 Died)
Andrea Torre, C.P.O. (25 Jan 1762 – 24 Dec 1791 Died)
Serafino Vitale,  O.S.B. (29 Jan 1798 – 1806 Died)

See also
Catholic Church in Italy

References

Books
  (in Latin)
 
 
 
 

Former Roman Catholic dioceses in Italy

de:Liste der Bischöfe von Minori